Bornislav Stáňa (born 12 November 1993) is a retired Czech football midfielder.

Career
He joined Baník Ostrava, who were newly-relegated to Czech National Football League, from Znojmo in June 2016. He helped his team gain promotion back into the Czech First League after just one year in the second tier competition. He scored his first top flight goal in his first Czech First League appearance for Baník Ostrava.

On 2 January 2019, SFC Opava announced the signing of Stáňa. On 23 February 2020, Stáňa joined 1. SK Prostějov on loan for the rest of the season. He ended the loan spell with 11 games and one goals, before joining FK Fotbal Třinec on 19 August 2020 on a year-long loan deal.

References

External links 
 
 
 Bronislav Stáňa profile on the FC Baník Ostrava official website
 Bronislav Stáňa profile on the SFC Opava official website

Czech footballers
1993 births
Living people
Czech First League players
Czech National Football League players
FC Baník Ostrava players
1. SC Znojmo players
SFC Opava players
1. SK Prostějov players
FC Zbrojovka Brno players
FK Fotbal Třinec players
Association football midfielders
People from Znojmo
Sportspeople from the South Moravian Region